Secret Rendezvous may refer to:
 Secret Rendezvous (band), a Dutch band
 Secret Rendezvous (novel), a 1977 book by Kōbō Abe
 "Secret Rendezvous" (song), a 1989 single by Karyn White
 Secret Rendez-Vous, a 1987 album by Cindy Valentine